The Gettys-Black divide is the primary drainage divide of Cumberland Township, Adams County, Pennsylvania; extending from the mouth of Stevens Creek southward past Samuel Gettys' 1761 tavern ~7 miles to the mouth of Plum Run at the dam site for Robert Black's 1798 Mill.  From a ridge within the Gettysburg borough, the divide extends southward across several strategic features of the Gettysburg Battlefield:
Cemetery Hill (503 ft)
Cemetery Ridge, including the triple point for Plum R/Stevens Cr (west) & Rock Cr (east)
Weikert Hill
Little Round Top
Big Round Top
The divide descends the east slope of Big Round Top and passes north of a drainage, then extends south-southeast across farm fields near the Taneytown Road to Rock Creek at the unincorporated community of Barlow, Pennsylvania.

References

Landforms of Adams County, Pennsylvania
Geography of Adams County, Pennsylvania